Ronghua Dam is a dam crossing the Dahan River, a tributary to the Tamsui River, in Fuxing District, Taoyuan City, Taiwan.

The dam was started in December 1978 and finished in June 1984. The cost was NT$1.83 billion.
The Ronghua Dam is within the catchment area of the Shihmen Reservoir, 27 kilometers upstream of the Shihmen Dam in the Dahan River gorge. The dam's main function is to prevent sand from moving downstream and building up as silt in the Shimen Reservoir.

As of 2012, the dam has no effective storage capacity, as almost its entire reservoir has been filled by sediment.

See also
Feitsui Dam
Shimen Dam
List of dams and reservoirs in Taiwan

References

External links

Taiwan Water Resources Agency 

1984 establishments in Taiwan
Arch dams
Dams completed in 1984
Dams in Taoyuan City